Iglesia de Santa Marina (Puerto de Vega) is a church in Asturias, Spain.

References

Churches in Asturias
Bien de Interés Cultural landmarks in Asturias